Elcot is a hamlet in Berkshire, England, and part of the civil parish of Kintbury. It is the location of the four-star Elcot Park Hotel.

The settlement lies near to the A4 road, and is located equidistant from both Hungerford and Newbury. It is also close to the hamlet Halfway.

References

Hamlets in Berkshire
Kintbury